is an interchange railway station located in the Azamino neighborhood of Aoba-ku, Yokohama, Kanagawa Prefecture, Japan, operated by the private railway company, Tokyu Corporation and by the Yokohama City Transportation Bureau.

Lines

Station layout

Tōkyū Den-en-toshi Line
Tōkyū Azamino Station has line has two opposed side platforms serving two tracks on the second floor of the station building.

Platforms

Yokohama Subway Blue Line
The underground Blue line Station has a single island platform.

Platforms

History
Azamino Station was opened on May 25, 1977, as a station on the Den-en-toshi Line. The Yokohama subway connected Azamino to Shin-Yokohama Station on March 18, 1993.

Passenger statistics
In fiscal 2019, the Tōkyū station was used by an average of 136,108 passengers daily. During the same period, the Yokohama Subway station was used by an average of 80,055 passengers daily.

The daily average passenger figures for previous years are as shown below.

See also
 List of railway stations in Japan

References

External links

Tokyu Railway Station Information 
Yokoham subway Station Information 

Railway stations in Kanagawa Prefecture
Railway stations in Japan opened in 1977
Railway stations in Yokohama